Dan Shaughnessy (born July 20, 1953) is an American sports writer. He has covered the Boston Red Sox for The Boston Globe since 1981. In 2016, he was given the J. G. Taylor Spink Award by the Baseball Hall of Fame. Shaughnessy is often referred to by his nickname "Shank," given by the 1980s Boston Celtics team for the often unflattering and critical nature of his articles.

Career
Shaughnessy was born in Groton, Massachusetts. After graduating from Groton High School, Shaughnessy subsequently attended the College of the Holy Cross, graduating in 1975. He began his career as a beat reporter covering the Baltimore Orioles for the Baltimore Evening Sun in 1977 and 1978. He then was the national baseball writer for The Washington Star from 1979 until the newspaper folded in 1981. He has been a sports writer for The Boston Globe since September, 1981. During that time, he has served as the beat writer for the Boston Celtics and the Boston Red Sox, as well as a sports columnist for the Globe.

Shaughnessy has authored or contributed to several sports-related books, including on the fierce Yankees–Red Sox rivalry. His book, The Curse of the Bambino, details the travails of the Boston Red Sox and their search for a World Series championship after selling Babe Ruth to the New York Yankees. He subsequently wrote Reversing the Curse after the Red Sox won the 2004 World Series.

He is a contributor to ESPN The Magazine, and a regular guest on a Sunday night sports show, Sports Xtra. Shaughnessy discusses sports and current events on radio shows airing on WTKK; on ESPN's Rome Is Burning; and on NESN's SportsPlus and Globe 10.0. On July 9, 2008, he made his debut as a guest host on the ESPN show Pardon the Interruption. He has a weekend radio show on WBZ-FM alongside Adam Jones.

Considered by some Red Sox fans and players as being overly negative and critical, he earned the pejorative nickname "Curly-Haired Boyfriend" from former Red Sox player Carl Everett.

In an October 2005 column Shaugnnessy revealed information detailing negotiations between then-Red Sox general manager Theo Epstein and Red Sox CEO Larry Lucchino. Shaughnessy and other Globe writers were accused by writers at the Boston Herald of routinely reporting information leaked from the Red Sox front office (the Red Sox were 17.75 percent owned by The New York Times Company, the Globe's parent company). Then–Boston Herald columnist Tony Massarotti accused Red Sox management of smearing Epstein and suggested the Globes coverage of the negotiations may be conflicted because of the Times ownership in the team. In the weeks leading up to Epstein's decision, Red Sox owner John Henry said the leaks "had to stop".

In 2013, Shaughnessy and Cleveland Indians manager Terry Francona released Francona, a biography focusing on Francona's years as manager of the Red Sox. The book immediately became a best-seller.

On December 8, 2015, Shaughnessy was named the 2016 recipient of the J. G. Taylor Spink Award, presented annually by the Baseball Writers' Association of America "for meritorious contributions to baseball writing". He was presented with the award during induction weekend at the National Baseball Hall of Fame in July 2016.

Personal life
He is married to Marilou Wit, with whom he has three children, Sarah, Kate, and Sam. He is the uncle of tennis player Meghann Shaughnessy.

Bibliography
 
 Reversing the Curse;  (hardcover),  (paperback)
 The Legend of the Curse of the Bambino; 
 The Curse of the Bambino; 
 Fenway, Expanded and Updated: A Biography in Words and Pictures, with Stan Grossfeld;  (hardcover),  (paperback)
 Spring Training: Baseball's Early Season; 
 At Fenway: Dispatches from Red Sox Nation; 
 Seeing Red: The Red Auerbach Story;  (hardcover),  (paperback)
 Ever Green the Boston Celtics: A History in the Words of Their Players, Coaches, Fans and Foes, from 1946 to the Present; 
 One Strike Away: The Story of the 1986 Red Sox;

References

External links
 Article on Shaughnessy
 Dan Shaughnessy's Current Columns: The Boston Globe
 Dan Shaughnessy Bio:WTKK
 
 On NECN to discuss the controversy over Theo Epstein
 Dan Shaughnessy Author/Illustrator Bio, Houghton Mifflin Harcourt

1953 births
Living people
College of the Holy Cross alumni
BBWAA Career Excellence Award recipients
People from Groton, Massachusetts
Sports in Boston
The Boston Globe people
Writers from Massachusetts
Sportswriters from Massachusetts